Tripterotyphinae is a subfamily in the family Muricidae.

Genera 
According to the World Register of Marine Species, the subfamily Tripterotyphinae contains four genera.
 Cinclidotyphis DuShane, 1969
 Pterotyphis Jousseaume, 1880
 Semityphis Martin, 1931
 Tripterotyphis Pilsbry & Lowe, 1932
Genera brought into synonymy
 Nothotyphis Fleming, 1962: synonym of Tripterotyphis Pilsbry & Lowe, 1932
 Perotyphis Jousseaume, 1880: synonym of Pterotyphis Jousseaume, 1880 (incorrect original spelling, see Errata p. 367; spelling Pterotyphis conserved under Art. 33.2.3.1)
 Trigonotyphis Jousseaume, 1882: synonym of Pterotyphis Jousseaume, 1880

References

 
Muricidae